Dipaculao, officially the Municipality of Dipaculao, is a 3rd class municipality in the province of Aurora, Philippines. According to the 2020 census, it has a population of 33,131 people.

The municipality is home to the Dinadiawan River Protected Landscape.

History
In the early part of 1921, immigrants from Central Luzon, including Ilocanos, arrived at present-day municipality, which was then a large strip of virgin lands along the Pacific Coast in what was then part of the province of Nueva Vizcaya; Central Luzon just did not include the literal political region, it also encompasses the central geographic location of Luzon island, it also includes Nueva Ecija, Tarlac, present areas of Nueva Vizcaya, and Pangasinan, which was politically part of Central Luzon itself. Another group of Ilocano settlers arrived from Ilocos Region, including La Union and Pangasinan.

Dipaculao was accidentally created while the Ilongots, the first inhabitants, were having thanksgiving festivities to commemorate the abundance of hunting and harvesting. Dipac, the Ilongot chieftain, was drunk with basi and tuba. The Ilocanos who were present saw him fell and shouted: "Dipac naulaw" or "Naulaw ni Dipac" (Dipac got dizzy, idiomatically "Dipac is/got drunk"), hence born the name Dipaculao.

On November 27, 1950, Dipaculao was converted from a barrio of Baler into an independent municipality of Quezon thru Executive Order No. 375. The late Anacleto Mijares was the first Municipal Mayor administered the transition of the municipality.

On June 21, 1957, the sitios of Dimabono, Laboy, Dinadiawan and Puangi were converted into barrios. Several more sitios were converted into barrios on June 18, 1966.

Geography
According to the Philippine Statistics Authority, the municipality has a land area of  constituting  of the  total area of Aurora.

Barangays
Dipaculao is politically subdivided into 25 barangays.

Climate

Demographics

In the 2020 census, Dipaculao had a population of 33,131.

Economy

Gallery

References

External links

[ Philippine Standard Geographic Code]
Dipaculao on Aurora.ph

Municipalities of Aurora (province)
Establishments by Philippine executive order